Jeffrey Spieler was born in 1945. He received his bachelor's degree from the University of Florida in 1967.  Spieler is currently the Senior Advisor for Science and Technology in Population and Reproductive Health for the United States Agency for International Development.

References

Info about Jeffrey Spieler on US State Department website
USAID article about Spieler
Research Article by Spieler

1945 births
Living people
University of Florida alumni
People from Florida